Ellen Dolan (born October 16, 1955 in Monticello, Iowa, USA) is an American actress.

Early life and career 
Dolan earned her B.A. and M.F.A. degrees in theater from the University of Iowa in Iowa City. While working toward her bachelor's degree, she spent a summer studying dramatic arts at the Webber Douglas Academy of Dramatic Art in London.

Dolan is best known for two daytime soap opera roles. She originated the role of Maureen Reardon Bauer on Guiding Light, and played the role from 1982 to 1986. She replaced Hillary Bailey Smith in late 1989 as Margo Hughes on As the World Turns. Dolan played Margo until 1993, when she moved to California to pursue nighttime television work.

Dolan returned to As the World Turns in 1994 and played Margo until the show ended in 2010.

In 1992, she was nominated for a Daytime Emmy for Outstanding Lead Actress.

Her additional television credits include the made-for-television movies Mother's Day, Mothers, Daughters and Lovers with Helen Shaver and Claude Akins, and Dancing with Danger, with Cheryl Ladd and Ed Marinaro.

Theatre 
Her stage career began in 1980 at the Milwaukee Repertory Theater with roles such as Katrin in Mother Courage. Her subsequent roles in numerous regional productions have included Maggie in Cat on a Hot Tin Roof at the Virginia Stage Company, Mary in How the Other Half Loves at the Pennsylvania Stage Company, and Clelia in The Nerd at the Capitol Repertory in Albany, NY. She also started a theater company in New York called The Studio Three Group.  She joined a repertory group called the WorkShop Theater Company in 2004 and has had leading roles in several mainstage productions there.

Personal life
Dolan and businessman Doug Jeffrey had their first child, a daughter, Angela Emmett Jeffrey (born 2000).

After ATWT ended, Dolan and Jeffrey sold their New York City home, the sale of which was featured as a story on the reality TV program Selling New York.

See also
Tom Hughes and Margo Montgomery
Supercouple

External links

SoapCentral page

References

1955 births
American soap opera actresses
American television actresses
People from Monticello, Iowa
University of Iowa alumni
Alumni of the Webber Douglas Academy of Dramatic Art
Living people
21st-century American women